Alexander James Mellor (born 22 July 1991) is an English cricketer who most recently played for Warwickshire. He is a left-handed batsman who also plays as a wicket-keeper.

Cricket career
Mellor joined Warwickshire from Staffordshire at the end of the 2015 season.

On 28 July 2016, Mellor joined Derbyshire on loan from Warwickshire, after regular wicket-keeper Harvey Hosein fractured his thumb. He made his Twenty20 debut for Derbyshire, on 29 July 2016, against Durham.

During the 2017 season, Warwickshire recalled Mellor as back up to the injured Tim Ambrose. However, having also been promoted to open the batting he was unable to take his opportunity, and averaged just 9.83 across three country championship matches.

References

External links
 
 
 Alex Mellor at Warwickshire County Cricket Club

1991 births
Living people
English cricketers
Staffordshire cricketers
Warwickshire cricketers
Derbyshire cricketers
Cricketers from Stoke-on-Trent
Wicket-keepers